Manuela Zinsberger (born 19 October 1995) is an Austrian professional footballer who plays as a goalkeeper for English Women's Super League club Arsenal and the Austria national team.

Life 
Zinsberger grew up in the village of Niederhollabrunn in Lower Austria. She was first trained at the LAZ Stockerau and from 2009 at the AKA St. Pölten. From the 2011/12 school year she moved to the newly established National Center for Women's Football in St. Pölten.

In 2017 she was named Austrian of the Year by Die Presse in the international success category. In December 2020 at age 25, she was named Austria's Footballer of the Year by the Austria Press Agency, being the first goalkeeper to win Footballer of the Year.

Club career

Youth Clubs 
In her youth, Zinsberger played for USV Leitzersdorf and SV Stockerau.

USVG Großrußbach 
In the winter transition period 2009/10, Manuela Zinsberger switched for the first time to adult football for USVG Großrußbach in the Lower Austrian state league. She made her debut on March 21, 2010 in a game against Maria Anzbach. In the 9 championship games she was able to keep 5 clean sheets.

SV Neulengbach 
In the summer of 2010, she moved to ÖFB-Frauenliga club SV Neulengbach and made her debut on October 30, 2010 (9th matchday) - shortly after her 15th birthday - in a 1-1 draw at home against FC Südburgenland. At the same time she played for the Neulengbach Juniors in the 2nd division East/South until 2013. Since the 2012/13 season she was the first-choice goalkeeper at SV Neulengbach.

FC Bayern Munich 
On June 27, 2014, Zinsberger signed a three-year contract with FC Bayern Munich.  She made her debut for Bayern Munich on September 21, 2014 (3rd matchday), when she won 4-1 with the second team in the away game against ETSV Würzburg. For the first team she completed her first Bundesliga game on November 30, 2014 (11th matchday) in a goalless draw away against SGS Essen.  On February 18, 2017 (matchday 12) she saved a penalty taken by Carolin Schiewe in the 74th minute in the away game against SC Freiburg and secured a 3-2 victory for her team. On February 26, 2017 (matchday 13), her team won 2-1 with two goals from Vivianne Miedema, who came on as a substitute in the 60th minute. On April 2, 2019, it was announced that Zinsberger would not renew her contract and would leave the club at her own request in the summer.  For the 2019/20 season, she was signed by English Premier League club Arsenal.

Arsenal WFC 
After moving to Arsenal WFC, Zinsberger quickly established herself as a first-choice goalkeeper and played six times in her first twelve games and conceded only 11 goals.  On 17 November 2019, Zinsberger was also part of the London derby victory between Arsenal and Chelsea, who celebrated a record crowd of 38,262 in the English Women's Super League.  Arsenal won 2-0 away, Zinsberger not conceding a goal in the record game.  In the 2019/20 UEFA Women's Champions League she played in a round of 16 game before the Covid break and in the quarter-finals after the break. The quarterfinals against Paris Saint-Germain was then lost 1-2. Third in the 2020/21 FA Women's Super League, Arsenal had to qualify for the 2021/22 UEFA Women's Champions League via the placement route, which included wins against Oqshetpes Kokshetau (4-0), PSV Eindhoven (3-1), and Slavia Prague (3:0 and 4:0), where she was in goal three times. In the group stage, she played in the home win against Hoffenheim (4-0) and in the two defeats against defending champions FC Barcelona (1:4 and 0:4). Second behind Barcelona thanks to the better goal difference over Hoffenheim, they reached the quarter-finals. Here she played in the two games against VfL Wolfsburg. After a 1-1 draw at home, they lost 2-0 in Wolfsburg. Arsenal finished the 2021/22 season as runners-up. Zinsberger made 20 appearances and was on the bench twice. On 5 February 2021 Zinsberger signed a long-term contract with Arsenal keeping her with the club until 2023. Zinsberger won the 2021/2022 Women's Super League Golden Glove with 13 clean sheets.

International career
After Zinsberger had played international matches for the U-17 and U-19 national teams, she was called into the senior Austria national team for the first time on June 2, 2013, for a fixture against neighbours Slovenia in Radlje ob Dravi. Aged 17, she played the second half of Austria's 3–1 win, substituted in the 46th minute for Anna-Carina Kristler, to gain her first senior cap.  At the 2014 Algarve Cup, she featured in the 2-0 defeat by North Korea on March 7, and in the 2-1 win over Portugal on March 12. She played three qualifiers for the 2015 World Cup in Canada: the 3-0 win on October 26, 2013 in Budapestagainst Hungary, as well as the two 1-3 defeats against France on October 31, 2013 in Ritzing and on April 9, 2014 in Le Mans.

In March 2016, she won the Cyprus Cup with Austria as the first entrant. With the senior national team, she finished the 2nd qualifying round for the 2017 European Championships as runners-up in Group 8 behind Norway and qualified for the first time in a major tournament. She got playing time in all three group stage matches, against Switzerland, France, and Iceland, as well as in the quarter-final against Spain, where she played an important role in winning the decisive penalty shootout. The team reached the semi-finals of the Euro 2017, where they lost to Denmark on penalties.

In qualifying for the 2019 World Cup, Zinsberger featured in all eight matches, keeping four clean sheets. The Austrians finished second in the group behind Spain, but missed the playoffs for the last place at the World Cup as the worst second in the group.

In qualifying for the Euro 2022, she played in all eight games and only conceded goals in the 0-3 away defeat against France. As the third-best third-placed team, the Austrians qualified for the finals of the European Championship for the second time, where they played the opening game against hosts England. With the finals being postponed by a year due to COVID-19, the first eight matches of qualifying for the 2023 World Cup took place before the finals, in which she played seven times and didn't concede a goal three times. On June 27, 2022, she was nominated for the European Championship finals.

In Austria's 1–0 defeat to England in the UEFA European Championship 2022 opening game, Zinzberger was admired for her friendliness to Arsenal teammate Beth Mead after Mead had scored the winning goal for England.

Personal life
On March 7, 2022, Zinsberger announced her engagement with girlfriend Madeleine.

Honours
SV Neulengbach
ÖFB-Frauenliga: 2010, 2011, 2012, 2013
ÖFB Cup: 2010, 2011, 2012

Bayern München
 Bundesliga:  2014–15, 2015–16
 DFB Cup runner-up: 2018
Arsenal

 FA Women's League Cup: 2022–23

Austria

 Cyprus Cup: 2016

Personal

 Austrian of the year in the international success category 2017
 Austrian Sportswoman of the Year 2017 
 Austria's Footballer of the Year (APA) 2020
 Women's Super League: Golden Glove Winner 2021–22

References

External links

 Profile at FC Bayern Munich 
 Profile at SV Neulengbach 

1995 births
Living people
Austrian women's footballers
Expatriate women's footballers in Germany
Expatriate women's footballers in England
FC Bayern Munich (women) players
Austrian expatriate women's footballers
Austrian expatriate sportspeople in Germany
Austrian expatriate sportspeople in England
Austria women's international footballers
Frauen-Bundesliga players
SV Neulengbach (women) players
Women's association football goalkeepers
People from Stockerau
Women's Super League players
Footballers from Lower Austria
ÖFB-Frauenliga players
UEFA Women's Euro 2022 players
LGBT association football players
Lesbian sportswomen
UEFA Women's Euro 2017 players

Arsenal W.F.C. players